The Archdiocese of Białystok is a Latin Church ecclesiastical territory or archdiocese of the Catholic Church in Podlaskie Voivodeship, Northeastern Poland. It is a metropolitan see with two suffragan dioceses.

Its cathedral archiepiscopal see is Bazylika Archikatedralna Wniebowzięcia NMP, a minor basilica in the episcopal see of Białystok. It also has a second minor basilica : Bazylika Ofiarowania Najświętszej Marii Panny, dedicated to the Presentation of the Blessed Virgin Mary, in Różanystok.

Ecclesiastical province 
Its Suffragan sees are :
 Diocese of Drohiczyn
 Diocese of Łomża

Statistics 
, it pastorally served 352,760 Catholics (80.5% of 438,200 total; however only 43,2% are active members) on 5,550 km² in 116 parishes and 25 missions with 411 priests (384 diocesan, 27 religious), 201 lay religious (31 brothers, 170 sisters) and 60 seminarians.

History 
 Established June 5, 1991 as Diocese of Białystok on Polish territory split off from the Metropolitan Archdiocese of Vilnius in Lithuania
 Enjoyed a Papal visit from the Pope John Paul II in June 1991.
 Promoted on March 25, 1992 by the same as Archdiocese of Białystok

Episcopal ordinaries

Bishops of Białystok 
 Edward Kisiel (1991.06.05 – retired 1992.03.25), died 1993; previously Titular Bishop of Limata (1976.05.03 – 1991.06.05) as Apostolic Administrator of Vilnius (Lithuania) (1976.05.03 – 1991.06.05)

Metropolitan Archbishops of Białystok
 Stanisław Szymecki (1993.05.15 – retired 2000.11.16), previously Bishop of Kielce (Poland) (1981.03.27 – 1993.05.15)
 Wojciech Ziemba (2000.11.16 – retired 2006.05.30); next Metropolitan Archbishop of Warmia (Poland) (2006.05.30 – 2016.10.15); previously Titular Bishop of Falerone (1982.06.19 – 1992.03.25) as Auxiliary Bishop of Warmia (Poland) (1982.06.19 – 1992.03.25), Bishop of Ełk (Poland) (1992.03.25 – 2000.11.16)
 Edward Ozorowski (2006.10.20 – retired 2017.04.12); previously Titular Bishop of Bitetto (1979.01.31 – 2006.10.20), first as Auxiliary Bishop of Vilnius (Lithuania) (1979.01.31 – 1991.06.05), then as Auxiliary Bishop of Białystok (1991.06.05 – succession 2006.10.20)
 Tadeusz Wojda, (S.A.C.) (2017.06.10 – 2021.03.02); next Metropolitan Archbishop of Gdańsk (Poland) (since 2021.03.25); previously Undersecretary of the Roman Congregation for the Evangelization of Peoples (2012.07.24 – 2017.04.12).
 Józef Guzdek (3 September 2021 – present); previously Titular Bishop of Treba (2004.09.15 – 2010.12.04) as Auxiliary Bishop of the Kraków, Bishop of Military Ordinariate of Poland (Poland) (2010.12.19 – 2021.07.14)

See also 
 List of Catholic dioceses in Poland
 Roman Catholicism in Poland

References

Sources and external links
 GCatholic.org, with Google map & satellite photo - data for all sections
 Catholic Hierarchy 
 Diocese website (in Polish)

Roman Catholic dioceses in Poland
Roman Catholic dioceses established in 1991
Christianity in Białystok
Archdiocese
1991 establishments in Poland